The 2015–16 World Rugby Sevens Series, known for sponsorship reasons as the HSBC World Rugby Sevens Series, was the 17th annual series of rugby union sevens tournaments for national men's rugby sevens teams. The Sevens Series has been run by World Rugby since 1999–2000. This season, the series expanded from nine to ten events.

Core teams

Fourteen teams from the 2014-15 season retained core status for the 2015–16 season. A fifteenth team, Russia, claimed core team status for the 2015–16 series at the 2015 Hong Kong Sevens qualifier. The core teams were:

Russia replaced Japan, which lost core team status having finished last of the fifteen core teams in the 2014–15 Sevens World Series.

Tour venues
The official schedule for the 2015–16 World Rugby Sevens Series is as follows:

Changes
There were three new tournaments in the series, with two events being discontinued:
 The Canada Sevens was a new stop at BC Place in Vancouver, paired with the USA Sevens.
 The Singapore Sevens returned, replacing the Japan Sevens. 
 The France Sevens returned for the first time since 2006, replacing the Scotland Sevens.

Two other existing tournaments had venue changes:
 The Australian Sevens moved from Gold Coast to Sydney.
 The South Africa Sevens moved from Port Elizabeth to Cape Town.

Standings

Final standings after completion of the ten tournaments in the series:

Source: World Rugby. Archived 

{| class="wikitable" style="font-size:92%;"
|-
!colspan=2| Legend 
|-
|No colour
|Core team in 2015–16 and re-qualified as a core team for the 2016–17 World Rugby Sevens Series
|-
|bgcolor=#fcc|Pink
|Relegated as the lowest placed core team at the end of the 2015–16 season
|-
|bgcolor=#ffc|Yellow
|Not a core team
|}

Tournaments

Dubai

The opening event of the season saw Fiji starting their defense of the title by taking out the opening event of the season in Dubai. On the opening day of competition, Fiji, South Africa and England each recorded three straight wins to finish on top. New Zealand finished on top in their group but not before losing to the United States in Pool C.

South Africa got knocked out in the quarter finals by the United States but would still end up taking home the plate after they defeated Australia in the final. While for Fiji, they would take the Dubai Sevens after they initially came from behind to win against England and taking the early lead.

South Africa

After Dubai, the teams had a back to back with Cape Town being the next stop in the series.

New Zealand

Australia

United States

Canada

Hong Kong

Singapore

France

England

Team statistics

Players

Scoring leaders

Updated: 24 May 2016

Dream Team

  Jasa Veremalua
  Osea Kolinisau
  Kwagga Smith
  Seabelo Senatla
  Perry Baker
  Collins Injera
  Fa’alemiga Selesele

See also
 2015–16 World Rugby Women's Sevens Series

References

External links
Official Site

 
World Rugby Sevens Series